Calloodes is a genus of shining leaf chafers (scarab beetles belonging to the Rutelinae subfamily).

Species
 Calloodes atkinsoni Waterhouse, 1868
 Calloodes frenchi Ohaus, 1912
 Calloodes grayianus White, 1845
 Calloodes rayneri Macleay, 1864

References

 Biolib

Rutelinae
Scarabaeidae genera